7-a-side football at the 2002 FESPIC Games were held 29–31 October 2002. There was 1 gold medals in this sport.

See also

References

External links
Website of CPISRA from October, 3rd, 2002
Cerebral Palsy International Sports & Recreation Association (CPISRA)
International Federation of Cerebral Palsy Football (IFCPF)

2002 FESPIC Games
2002